This list of Numéro Russia cover models  is a catalog of cover models who have appeared on the cover of the Russian edition of Numéro magazine, starting with the magazine's first issue in March 2013.

2013

2014

2015

2016

2017

2018

External links
 Numéro Russia
 Numero Russia on Models.com

Russia